The A Legend Star Entertainment Corp. is an artist agency in Taiwan, founded by former Channel [V] Taiwan director Andy Chang and the entertainer Blackie Chen on January 10, 2010.

Artist roster

Past Artist in ALS
MeiMei Kuo (MeiMei) (Vice leader) (2010-2012)
Mardy Lin (Hsiao Ma) (2010-2012)
Angel Hung (Hung Shih) (2010-2012)
Bella Cheng (Yu Tu) (2010-2013)
Shadya Wang (Lan Yu Shih) (2010-2012)

Taiwanese companies established in 2010
Entertainment companies established in 2010
Taiwanese talent agencies